Shaykh Hasan al-Attar (1766–1835) was an Islamic scholar, Grand Imam of al-Azhar from 1830 to 1835. A "polymathic figure", he wrote on grammar, science, logic, medicine and history. Hassan al-Attar was appointed Sheikh of al-Azhar in 1830 and became one of the earliest reformist clerics in Ottoman Egypt. He was a forerunner of Egypt's national revival, and his legacy was a generation of Egyptian modernists like his disciple Rifa al-Tahtawi. He advocated the introduction of sciences such as logic and modern astronomy, and wrote the first modern history of Mohammed's tribe, the Quraish. He was to suffer greatly for his modernizing beliefs.

His first contact with foreign (non-Muslim) knowledge came during the French occupation of Egypt (1798–1801). Fearing for his safety after the French withdrawal, he left Cairo for Istanbul. There he studied and read voraciously, from 1802 through 1806, when he continued his studies in Alexandretta (today Iskenderum), Izmir and Damascus, returning to Egypt in 1815. He was the first director of the new medical college, defending the necessity of corpse dissection, which he had observed in the Cairo veterinary college, against the non-experimental, theoretical teachings of eleventh-century Avicenna, discarded centuries ago in Christian Europe. While he was a successful lecturer at al-Azhar University, his time there was marked by continual conflict with un-Westernized (?) ulemas, leading him at times to conduct classes in his home. The tensions only became worse with his appointment as rector. He died within four years.

References

Further reading
 F. De Jong, 'The itinerary of Hasan al-'Attar (1766-1835): a reconsideration and its implications', Journal of Semitic Studies, Vol. 28, No. 1 (1983), pp. 99–128.

External links
 Rediscovering Al-'Attar
 Dunne, Bruce William. ''Sexuality and the 'Civilizing Process' in Modern Egypt'. ProQuest, UMI Dissertations Publishing, 1996.

Asharis
Shafi'is
Grand Imams of al-Azhar
Egyptian Sunni Muslims
Muslim writers
Egyptian people of Moroccan descent
1766 births
1835 deaths